Wanda McKenzie Cowley (7 September 1924 – 26 September 2017) was a New Zealand children's writer.

Biography 
Cowley was born in Auckland in 1924. She studied at the University of Auckland, completing a bachelor of arts degree and a diploma in education.

Cowley died on 26 September 2017, at the age of 93. Her ashes were buried at Onetangi Cemetery on Waiheke Island.

Publications 
 Biddy Alone (1988)
 Trespassers (Mallinson Rendel Publishers, 1991)
 Biddy and the Night Birds (Mallinson Rendel Publishers, 1994)
Scrimshaw Secret (2007)

References

1924 births
2017 deaths
University of Auckland alumni
People from Auckland
New Zealand children's writers
New Zealand women children's writers
Burials at Onetangi Cemetery